Daniel Russell (born 5 December 1995) is a Papua New Guinea international rugby league footballer who plays as a  forward for the St George Illawarra Dragons.

Background
Russell was born in Longreach, Queensland, Australia and is of Papua New Guinean descent through his father, Mark, who was born in Port Moresby and raised in Madang. 

Russell played his junior football for Emerald Brothers and attended The Cathedral College, Rockhampton.

Playing career
In 2012 and 2013, Russell played for the Central Queensland Capras in the Mal Meninga Cup. In 2014, he joined the Brisbane Broncos NYC side, playing seven games for them in 2015.

In 2016, Russell joined the Souths Logan Magpies, playing for their Queensland Cup side for three seasons. On 6 October 2018, Russell started on the wing for the PNG PM's XIII in their loss to the Australian Prime Minister's XIII.

On 11 October 2018, Russell signed a two-year deal with the North Queensland Cowboys. He did not make his NRL debut in 2019, spending the entire season playing for the Cowboys' Queensland Cup feeder club, the Mackay Cutters. He was elevated into the Cowboy's top 30 squad for the 2020 season, after spending 2019 in the development squad.

On 2 October 2019, Russell represented Papua New Guinea at the 2019 Rugby League World Cup 9s. On 9 November 2019, Russell made his Test debut for Papua New Guinea in their 20–22 loss to Fiji.

In February 2020, Russell was a member of the Cowboys' 2020 NRL Nines winning squad. On 3 October 2020, the Cowboys announced that Russell would be departing the club at the end of the season without ever playing a first grade game. He missed the entire 2020 season after tearing his pectoral muscle. In 2021, he joined the Brisbane Tigers in the Queensland Cup.

Russell was named in the PNG squad for the 2021 Rugby League World Cup and played in all 4 of their matches during the tournament, scoring tries against Tonga and Wales 

In November 2022, Russell signed a train-and-trial contract with the St George Illawarra Dragons for the 2023 pre-season.

Achievements and accolades

Team
2020 NRL Nines: North Queensland Cowboys – Winners

References

External links
North Queensland Cowboys profile
QRL profile

1995 births
Living people
Australian people of Papua New Guinean descent
Australian rugby league players
Eastern Suburbs Tigers players
Papua New Guinean rugby league players
Papua New Guinea national rugby league team players
Rugby league centres
Rugby league second-rows
Rugby league players from Queensland
Rugby league wingers
Souths Logan Magpies players
Mackay Cutters players